Driggs is a surname. Notable people with the surname include:

Driggs family, prominent American Family 
Deborah Driggs, model, author, and actress
Edmund H. Driggs, United States Representative from New York
Elsie Driggs, American painter mostly known for her contributions to the Precisionism movement of the 1920s
John F. Driggs, United States Representative from Michigan

See also 
 Driggs family